Brigadier-General Frederick Gordon Spring,  (25 July 1878 – 24 September 1963) was a senior British Army officer.

Early life
Spring was born in 1878 in Bombay, India, the son of Colonel Frederick William Spring, a Royal Artillery officer. He was educated at Blundell's School and the Royal Military College, Sandhurst.

Military career
Spring was commissioned into the Royal Lincolnshire Regiment as a second lieutenant on 7 May 1898, and promoted to lieutenant on 3 January 1900. He served with the regiment in South Africa during the Second Boer War, from June 1900 he took part in operations in Transvaal. He was again seconded for service in South Africa in April 1902, when he commanded a mounted infantry contingent. The war ended two months later, and Spring left Cape Town in the SS Dunera in late September 1902, arriving at Southampton early the following month.

Spring was adjutant of the 2nd Battalion of his regiment between 1904 and 1907, and was promoted to captain in 1905. He retired from the army as a major in 1907, but was recalled to service at the outbreak of the First World War.

World War 1
He initially served as an Embarkation Officer, but was soon posted to the Staff of the 33rd (Infantry) Brigade as its Signals Officer. He was deployed to Gallipoli with the brigade in 1915, and was involved in the successful capture of "Chocolate Hill" by the 6th (Service) Battalion of the Lincolnshire Regiment from Ottoman Empire forces during the Battle of Sari Bair. However, the battalion suffered heavy losses and Spring was injured in the action. Upon recovery he was promoted to lieutenant-colonel in June 1916, and took command of the 11th (Service) Battalion of the Essex Regiment, which at the time was engaged on the Western Front with the 6th Infantry Division. Whilst in this position Spring presided over a Divisional court martial that sentenced Pte. Harry Farr of the 1st Battalion West Yorkshire Regiment to death for cowardice. Spring commanded the 11th (S) Battalion Essex Regiment during the Battle of the Somme, and at the Battle of Cambrai. He was promoted to colonel in 1918. In September 1918 he returned to the 33rd Brigade as its brigadier-general. He was Mentioned in Dispatches five times over the course of the war. He was also awarded the Croix de guerre by the French government.

Post-war military career
Following the end of World War 1, Spring was appointed Senior Instructor at the Senior Officers' School, Belgaum, India from January 1921 to September 1922. Returning to England, Spring continued to serve with the Lincolnshire Regiment, commanding the 1st Battalion between 1923 and 1927. In this capacity he was in charge of the battalion during its deployment to Northern Ireland from 1923 to 1924 in support of the Royal Ulster Constabulary.

Between 1927 and 1931, Spring was Assistant Quartermaster General of Southern Command in England. He was subsequently the commander of the Poona (Independent) Brigade Area, Southern Command, India until his retirement in 1935. From 1935 to 1939, he served as Inspector of Recruiting. During the Second World War, he worked on the Imperial General Staff at the War Office. He was also a Justice of the Peace.

Death
Spring died in 1963 in Aldershot, Hampshire. There is a memorial in Lincoln Cathedral to his memory.

Personal life
He married Violet Maud Turnbull, the granddaughter of Colonel Henry Law Maydwell, in late 1919. In 1933 Spring's nine-year-old son, John Gordon Spring, died after an accident while being shown around the Royal Navy battleship HMS Hood at Portsmouth. He accidentally fell 60 ft down an open hatch and died of injuries sustained the next day.

Publications
The History of the 6th (Service) Battalion Lincolnshire Regiment 1914 – 1919 (Written in the 1920s – first published in 2009 by Poacher Books)

References

|-
 

|-

1878 births
1963 deaths
British Army brigadiers
Royal Lincolnshire Regiment officers
Essex Regiment officers
Frederick
British Army generals of World War I
Companions of the Order of the Bath
Graduates of the Royal Military College, Sandhurst
British Army personnel of the Second Boer War
Companions of the Order of St Michael and St George
Companions of the Distinguished Service Order
Recipients of the Croix de Guerre 1914–1918 (France)
People educated at Blundell's School
Military personnel of British India
British Army generals of World War II